Mojave Heights is an unincorporated community in the Victor Valley of the Mojave Desert, within San Bernardino County, California.

The town is located just south of Oro Grande, between Victorville and Adelanto.

It lies at an elevation of 2,759 feet / 841 meters.

References

Unincorporated communities in San Bernardino County, California
Populated places in the Mojave Desert
Victor Valley
Unincorporated communities in California